KKJD is a class A radio station broadcasting a Christian radio format from Borrego Springs, California.

History
KKJD began broadcasting on August 31, 2012.

References

External links
 

Mass media in San Diego County, California
2013 establishments in California
Radio stations established in 2013
KJD (FM)